Agrilus coxalis is a species of jewel beetle from Guatemala and Mexico, formerly confused with a very similar species from Arizona, Agrilus auroguttatus, which is a significant pest.

References

coxalis
Woodboring beetles
Beetles of Central America
Beetles of North America
Beetles described in 1889